The 2016 New Zealand Music Awards was the 51st holding of the annual ceremony featuring awards for musical recording artists based in or originating from New Zealand. It took place in November 2016 at Vector Arena in Auckland and was hosted by comedy duo Jono Pryor and Ben Boyce. The awards show was broadcast live on TV3 and The Edge TV.

Nominations for the 2016 New Zealand Music Awards opened on 20 June 2016, and cover artists who have had commercial recordings released between 1 July 2015 and 31 July 2016. Nominations closed on 3 August 2016. The nominees were announced on 13 October, along with the 2016 Legacy Award recipient and the Critics' Choice Prize shortlist.

Early awards
While most of the awards were presented at the main awards ceremony held in November, five genre awards are presented earlier in the year at ceremonies of their field.

The first was awarded in February, with the Tui for Best Folk Album presented at the Auckland Folk Festival in Kumeu to Queenstown singer-songwriter Holly Arrowsmith for her debut album For the Weary Traveller.
The Tui for Best Jazz Album was presented in March at the National Jazz Festival in Tauranga to Phil Broadhurst Quintet for their album Panacea.
The Best Country Music Album Tui was presented in June at the New Zealand Country Music Awards in Gore to The Warratahs for their album Runaway Days.
The Tui for Best Pacific Music Album was presented in June at the Vodafone Pacific Music Awards to the performance group Te Vaka for their album Amataga.
The Tui for the Best Children's Music Album was presented in August on What Now to Itty Bitty Beats for their album Lay Your Head Down.

In addition, the artisan awards (previously known as the technical awards) were presented on 20 October at a cocktail event at the Pullman Hotel in Auckland. The Critics' Choice prize event and winner announcement will be held on 2 November at the Tuning Fork bar in Auckland.

Nominees and winners
New for 2016, the technical awards have been renamed the artisan awards, and the Best Electronica Album award is now named Best Electronic Album. Broods dominated the awards, picking up Album of the Year, Single of the Year, Best Group, Best Pop Album and the People's Choice Award. R&B singer Aaradhna won Best Urban/Hip Hop Album, but refused to accept the award as she felt a category that included both R&B and rap acts was putting the two genres together for racial reasons. She then informally presented the award to rap group SWIDT. Recorded Music NZ still lists Aaradhna as the winner of the category.
Winners are listed first and highlighted in boldface.
Key
 – Artisan award

References

External links
Official New Zealand Music Awards website

New Zealand Music Awards, 2016
Music Awards, 2016
Aotearoa Music Awards
November 2016 events in New Zealand